The Record-Courier was an independent weekly paper published in Baker City from 1901 to 2016. It was a competitor of the tri-weekly Baker City Herald, publishing on Thursdays with a circulation of 2,470.

History 
In 1928, newspaper owner Charles M. Brinton bought the North Powder News (1901) and the Haines Record (1903). He would merge them with the Huntington Courier (1930) in 1934 to create The Record-Courier.

Brinton's son, Byron "By" Brinton, served as the paper's editor from 1934 to 1999. He also served as publisher from 1959 to 2004. His son, Byron Dorsey " RonD" Brinton, took over as editor in 1999 and publisher in 2004. With By's passing in 2005 and RonD's in 2006, RonD's brother Greg Brinton took over. He would go on to sell the paper to Lynn and Gina Perkins.

In July 2016, The Record-Courier announced through a post on its Facebook page that it would be closing. The post read:

"Because of health reasons, the Record-Courier is closed and won't be printing any further editions until further notice. I apologize for the inconvenience and thank you for your kindness and support."

References

External links
 The Record-Courier (official website)

Baker City, Oregon
Newspapers published in Oregon
Newspapers established in 1901
Weekly newspapers published in the United States
1901 establishments in Oregon
2016 disestablishments in Oregon
Defunct newspapers published in Oregon